Martin Wainwright MBE is a British journalist and author. He left The Guardian after 37 years at the end of March 2013.

Early life 
He was born in Leeds, and educated at Shrewsbury School and Oxford University.  His father Richard Wainwright was the Liberal MP for Colne Valley (1966–70, February 1974–87) after a career in accountancy.

Career 
Wainwright was The Guardian's Northern Editor for seventeen years until the end of 2012, when he was succeeded by Helen Pidd. His contributions to the newspaper have mostly reflected this emphasis but not exclusively.

He has written several books on northern or countryside topics, including a biography of the unrelated Alfred Wainwright and a guide to the Coast to Coast Walk. Other books are on the Morris Minor and Mini cars. He writes a blog about another interest, moths.

Wainwright was awarded an MBE in the 2000 New Year Honours, "For services to the National Lottery Charities Board in Yorkshire and Humberside."

He was awarded an honorary degree by the University of Leeds in 2013.

Personal life 
He is chair of the trustees of the Scurrah Wainwright Charity, named after his grandfather Henry Scurrah Wainwright OBE (1877-1968), a Leeds chartered accountant with interests in social reform and delphiniums, and a trustee of the Andrew Wainwright Reform Trust, named for his brother who died in 1974.

One of Martin Wainwright's two sisters, Hilary, is the radical academic who has long been associated with the Red Pepper magazine.

His two sons are both journalists – Oliver is the Guardian's architecture and design critic and Tom is the Economist'''s Mexico City bureau chief.

Selected publicationsWainwright: the Man Who Loved the Lakes, 2007, BBC Books, Guardian Book of the Countryside (By Ruth Petrie & Martin Wainwright), 2008, Cornerstone, A Mini Adventure: 50 years of the iconic small car, 2009, Aurum Press, True North 2009, Guardian Books, Morris Minor; the Biography: sixty years of Britain's favourite car 2010, Aurum Press,  The Coast to Coast Walk (Recreational Path Guides), 2010 (revised ed), Aurum Press, Wild City: Encounters with Urban Wildlife'', 25 May 2011, Aurum Press,

References

External links
 Listing of published articles

English newspaper editors
English male journalists
English non-fiction writers
Living people
Writers from Leeds
Year of birth missing (living people)
People educated at Shrewsbury School
English male non-fiction writers